Vikinglotto (formerly known in Denmark as Onsdags Lotto, "Wednesday Lotto", as Víkingalottó in Iceland, and as Vikingų Loto in Lithuania) is a cooperation between the national lotteries in Norway, Sweden, Denmark, Iceland, Finland, Latvia, Lithuania, Estonia, Slovenia (in 2017) and Belgium (in 2020). Vikinglotto started in 1993 and was the first of its kind in Europe.

Tickets and draws
Draws are held at 20:00 CET every Wednesday evening and they take place at Norsk Tipping in Hamar, Norway.

Tickets can be purchased from authorised retailers, or online, in each of the ten participating countries. The cost per combination varies in each member country, ranging from just €1.00 in Latvia and 90kr. (approximately €0.71) in Iceland up to €10.00 in Belgium.

Play
For every line, or combination, a player enters into the draw, they must select six main numbers which can be any distinct integers from 1 to 48. Then they must also pick one bonus number, known as the Viking number, from between 1 and 5 (previously 8).

In the past drawings, two bonus numbers and one special number were drawn, but these were replaced by the Viking number in May 2017.

During the draw, six main numbers are drawn from 1 - 48 and the additional Viking number is drawn from a separate pool of 1 - 5 (again previously 8). As the Viking number is drawn from a different pool, the same number could appear twice in a single draw - once as a main number and once as the Viking number.

Prize structure
The Vikinglotto jackpot starts at €3 million and can grow up to a maximum of €25 million (previously €35 million). The jackpot and the second prize are shared between all participating countries on a pari-mutuel basis, and all contribute to the prize fund for these two tiers. Smaller prizes are determined at a national level, using the remaining funds from ticket sales. This arrangement is different from EuroMillions and Eurojackpot where all prize categories are common to all participating countries.

Belgium offer the most prize tiers, with eleven different ways to win. The lowest prize in Belgium is awarded for matching just one main number. Sweden offers the fewest chances to win with just five prize tiers available. Players here must match at least three main numbers to earn a prize.

See also
Lottery

References

External links
 Danske Spil 
 Eesti Loto 
 Íslensk Getspá/Getraunir 
 Veikkaus 
 Norsk Tipping 
 Svenska Spel 
 Latvijas Loto 
 Olifėja 
 Vikinglotto Loterija Slovenije (in Slovenian)
 Vikinglotto (in Dutch)
 Vikinglotto (in French)

Lottery games
Economy of Denmark
Games and sports introduced in 1991